The 3rd Corps of the Army of the Republic of Bosnia and Herzegovina was one of five (later 7) corps that comprised the Army of the Republic of Bosnia and Herzegovina. It was established by the order of the Commander of Main Staff of the Bosnian Army Sefer Halilović on 9 November 1992 under Alija Izetbegović. This Corps was formed to unite the rest of the Territorial Defence Force of the Republic of Bosnia and Hercegovina and some Bosnian Special Forces and Civilian Forces.

Operational Zone 
The operational zone for the 3rd Corps were the districts of : Banja Luka, Bosanska Dubica, Bosanska Gradiška, Breza, Bugojno, Busovača, Čelinac, Donji Vakuf, Gornji Vakuf, Jajce, Kakanj, Kotor Varoš, Kupres, Laktaši, Mrkonjić Grad, Novi Travnik, Prnjavor, Skender Vakuf, Srbac, Šipovo, Travnik, Vitez, Zavidovići, Zenica and Žepče. Because of the fighting, there was a quick change in the territory and Vareš was included.

Command 
The Headquarters of the 3rd Corps was in Zenica. It was composed of a number of centers:
 Center for operational command which had intelligence on the civilians, MUP-a, which the more important intelligence was given to the command of the 3rd Corps.
 Center for relations, the planning of all the relations connection to the 3rd Corps command. 
 Military Intelligence Service: a service for counter-intelligence, military police, protection of the commands and other objects. The Commander was Ramiz Dugalić.

Commanders
Enver Hadžihasanović, 1st (Dec 1992–Nov 1993)
Mehmed Alagić, 2nd (Nov 1993–Jan 1994)
Kadir Jusić, 3rd (Jan 1994–Sep 1994)	 
Sakib Mahmuljin, 4th (Sep 1994–end of war)

Operational Groups 
In February 1993, four operational groups were created under the command of Enver Hadžihasanović, the goal was to connect the 3rd Corps forces on the battlefield and the 3rd Corps Command:
 Operational group Bosanska Krajina headquarters in Travnik, Commander at the time Mehmed Alagić
 Operational group Lašva in Kakanj,
 Operational group Bosna in Žepče or Zavidovići,
 Operational group Zapad in Bugojno, Commander Selmo Cikotić
 Operational group Visoko in Visoko, later renamed Operational group Istok. This belonged to the 1st Corps, then 6th Corps.

3rd Corps Units 
 3rd Corps Military Police

Operational group Bosanska Krajina
 7th Muslim Brigade
 17th Brigade
 306th Brigade, once belonged to Operational group West
 325th Brigade

Operational group Lašva
 309th Brigade
 325th Brigade
 333rd Brigade

Operational group Bosnia
 318th Brigade
 319th Brigade

Operational group West 
 307th Brigade
 308th Brigade
 312th Brigade
 317th Brigade

These brigades were under the direct command of the 3rd Corps Command.
 301st Brigade
 303rd Mountain Brigade
 304th Mountain Brigade Breza
 314th Mountain Brigade

Corps of the Army of the Republic of Bosnia and Herzegovina